Shiodome Legend (1997) was the fifth and final Summer Spectacular and second Shiodome Legend professional wrestling television event produced by Frontier Martial-Arts Wrestling (FMW). The event took place on August 2, 1997 at Shiodome in Tokyo, Japan and aired on Samurai TV!.

The main event was a no ropes exploding barbed wire deathmatch between Masato Tanaka and W*ING Kanemura for the right to face Atsushi Onita in the main event of Kawasaki Legend: Fall Spectacular. Kanemura won the match and earned a match against Onita at Fall Spectacular, which stipulated that if Kanemura lost, W*ING Alliance would disband.

Results

References

1997 in professional wrestling
1997
1997 in Japan
August 1997 events in Asia